Sapphire is an unincorporated community in Transylvania County, North Carolina, United States. Sapphire has a post office with ZIP code 28774.

References

Unincorporated communities in Transylvania County, North Carolina
Unincorporated communities in North Carolina